Egigio Pribetti (19 October 1925) is an Italian former long jumper, speciality in which he was 4th at the 1946 European Athletics Championships.

Achievements

See also
 Italy at the 1946 European Athletics Championships

References

External links
 
 Egidio Pribetti at Arena di Pola 

1925 births
Possibly living people
Italian male long jumpers
Istrian Italian people